Addison Clark (1842–1911) was a co-founder and the first president of Texas Christian University (TCU).

Biography
Addison Clark was born in Titus County, Texas on December 11, 1842.

He served in the Confederate Army during the Civil War.

In 1873, he and his brother Randolph founded Add-Ran Male & Female College in Thorp Spring, Texas, and he served as its first president. The school was later renamed Texas Christian University.

Addison Clark died at his daughter's home in Comanche, Texas in May 1911.

References

Texas Christian University
Heads of universities and colleges in the United States
1842 births
1911 deaths
University and college founders
Christian Church (Disciples of Christ) clergy